Simon Ollert (born 14 April 1997) is a German footballer who plays as a centre-forward for SV Pullach.

Career
Ollert made his professional debut for SpVgg Unterhaching in the 3. Liga on 16 September 2014, coming on as a substitute in the 72nd minute for Pascal Köpke in the 1–3 home loss against Arminia Bielefeld.

Personal life
Ollert has been deaf in both ears since birth, and wears hearing aids when playing football. He is the second hearing impaired professional footballer in Germany, after Stefan Markolf for Mainz 05.

References

External links
 Profile at DFB.de
 Profile at kicker.de
 FC Memmingen II statistics 2017–18

1997 births
Living people
German footballers
German deaf people
Deaf association football players
Association football forwards
SpVgg Unterhaching players
3. Liga players
Regionalliga players
FC Ingolstadt 04 II players
FC Memmingen players